Androsace saussurei is a plant species in the family Primulaceae.

Taxonomy
Androsace saussurei was named after Horace Bénédict de Saussure, an eighteenth-century scientist from Geneva. The holotype was collected in Mont Blanc in Haute-Savoie of France.

Description
The flowers are white to purplish,  in diameter. And the buds are often purplish as well. It typically flowers from June to August.

Habitat and distribution
It is endemic to the Western Alps (Mont Blanc, Gran Paradiso, Valais, Vanoise, Thabor).

References

saussurei
Alpine flora
Flora of the Alps